in-circuit is an adjective that is used in following terms:

 In-circuit debugging
 In-circuit emulation
 In-circuit emulator
 In-circuit programming